Hawk Bridge, Ely, is a railway bridge carrying the Ipswich to Ely line across the River Great Ouse in Cambridgeshire, England. The bridge is located half-a-mile east of Ely Dock Junction. Hawk Bridge was rebuilt in 2007 following the derailment of a freight train.

See also
 Railways in Ely
 Ely railway station

References

 Ordnance Survey: Explorer map sheet 226 Ely & Newmarket 
 Eastern Main Lines - Cambridge to Ely; Richard Adderson and Graham Kenworthy; Middleton Press; published 2005; 

Ely, Cambridgeshire
Railway bridges in Cambridgeshire
Bridges across the River Great Ouse